IS Halmia is a football club, located in Halmstad, Sweden.

Background

IS Halmia was founded  on 16 June 16, 1907 and currently plays in Division 2 Västra Götaland.

In early years, the club also played bandy. The first ever bandy game between two organised teams in Halland, is thought to have been played between Halmia and local rival Halmstads BK in 1922. In 1932 Halmia won the Halland district championship in this sport.

In 1932 the club also became the first team from Halmstad to reach the Allsvenskan, the top-tier football league in Sweden.

In total IS Halmia has played 11 seasons in the Allsvenskan, the last time being in 1979. The club's best spell was from 1944 until 1950 when they spent seven seasons at the top level.  They have also enjoyed 44 seasons playing second tier Swedish football.  However they have been less successful in recent years.

The club shares Örjans vall with, its rival of many years, Halmstads BK. They still hold the record attendance of 20,381 spectators for a promotion playoff match in 1962. IS Halmia are affiliated to the Hallands Fotbollförbund.

Key dates in the history of IS Halmia are as follows;

1907: The club was formed on 16 June 1907 with Axel Hagnell as chairman. The programme included football, athletics, gymnastics and wrestling.
1909: Lost 0–11 to Helsingborgs IF, a record defeat that still stands.
1912: Became Halmia Halland champions for the first time by defeating Halmstad IF 5–3 in the final.
1924: Played in Division 2 Sydsvenskan for the first time and finished fifth.
1925: Lost to IFK Uddevalla in the promotion playoffs after winning Division 2 Sydsvenskan.
1932: Played in the Allsvenskan for the first time. Herbert Samuelsson signs from IFK Göteborg.
1934: Relegated from the Allsvenskan.
1940: After winning the Division 2 Södra title failed in the promotion playoff against Degerfors IF.
1943: Regained place in the Allsvenskan after winning the Division 2 Södra title and the promotion playoff against Örgryte IS.
1944: Finished seventh in the Allsvenskan – a feat that was to be repeated in 1947 and 1948.
1950: Relegated from the Allsvenskan but went to the semifinals of the Swedish Cup.
1962: Winners of Division 2 Västra Götaland and won the promotion playoff group comprising AIK, Landskrona BOIS and IFK Holmsund.
1963: Disastrous season back in the Allsvenskan winning only one game.
1970: The club started running ladies teams.
1974: Frank Marshall was recruited as club coach with a promise that Allsvenskan football would be achieved within 5 years – a promise that he accomplished.
1978: The club win Division 2 Södra and are promoted to the Allsvenskan.
1979: Finished bottom of the Allsvenskan winning just two games.
1989: Relegated to Division 3 Sydvästra Götaland bringing tier 4 football to Örjans vall for the first time. The league proved to be a real hornet's nest with many excellent Halland teams.
1991: A grim year for men's football with demotion to Division 4 Halland representing tier 5 football just 12 years after playing in the top tier. A missed penalty in the season's final match against Gislaved IS proved crucial.
1992: The club win Division 4 Halland.
1993: Another promotion with the club winning the Division 3 Sydvästra Götaland title.
1997: Winners of Division 2 Södra Götaland and won the promotion playoffs against Trollhättans FK and Nybro IF.
1998: Finishing last in Division 1 Södra proves a bitter disappointment.
1999: Another relegation this time from Division 2 Södra Götaland.
2000: The club face life in Division 3 Sydvästra Götaland with bankruptcy and the loss of coach Bjorn Andersson to Bayern Munich.
2006: The club stabilises and the finances are under control but on the playing front following league re-structuring the first team are again playing tier 5 football.
2008: Winners of Division 3 Sydvästra Götaland  and are promoted.
2012: Winners of Division 2 Södra Götaland.
2015: Relegated from Division 1 Södra.
2018: Finished runners-up in Division 2 Västra Götaland and therefore entered the promotion playoffs.
2020: Relegated from Division 2 Västra Götaland.

Season to season

Attendances

In recent seasons IS Halmia have had the following average attendances:

Footnotes

External links
 IS Halmia – Official website

 
Football clubs in Halland County
IS Halmia
Allsvenskan clubs
Association football clubs established in 1907
Bandy clubs established in 1907
IS Halmia